Seeley is a census-designated place (CDP) in Cumberland County, New Jersey, United States. It is in the northern part of the county, on the west side of Upper Deerfield Township. The western border of the CDP is the Cohansey River, which forms the border with Hopewell Township to the west.

Seeley was first listed as a CDP prior to the 2020 census.

Demographics

References 

Census-designated places in Cumberland County, New Jersey
Census-designated places in New Jersey
Upper Deerfield Township, New Jersey